Southfield Public Schools, also known as the Southfield Public School District (SPSD), is a school district headquartered in Southfield, Michigan, United States. It serves the cities of Southfield and Lathrup Village.

Dress codes
Students in grades PreKindergarten-8 are required to wear school uniforms. For all grades denim trousers are prohibited.

Schools

High schools
Zoned
 Southfield High School for the Arts and Technology (Southfield)
Alternative
 University High School Academy (Southfield, housed at Southfield-Lathrup High School)

K-8 Schools
Zoned
 Brace-Lederle K-8 School (Southfield, formerly Lederle Middle School)
 Birney K-8 School (Southfield, formerly Birney Middle School)
Alternative
 MacArthur K-8 University Academy (Southfield, formerly MacArthur Elementary School)
 Thompson K-8 International Academy (Southfield, formerly Thompson Middle School)

Middle schools

 Levey Middle School (Southfield)

Elementary schools
 Adler Elementary School (Southfield)
 McIntyre Elementary School (Southfield)
 Adlai F. Stevenson Elementary School (Southfield)
 Vandenberg World Cultures Academy (Southfield, formerly Vandenberg Elementary School)

Early childhood schools
 Bussey Center For Early Childhood Education (Southfield, formerly Northbrook Elementary School)
 Champions at Magnolia Preschool (Southfield, formerly Magnolia Elementary School)

Alternative schools
 Southfield Regional Academic Campus (SRAC) (Southfield, formerly Brace Elementary School)

Defunct schools
 Southfield-Lathrup High School (Lathrup Village, closed in 2016, currently home to the University High School Academy program)
 Angling Road Elementary School (Southfield, converted to office space)
 Brooks School (Southfield, former library, now Greyhound bus station)
 Eisenhower Elementary School (Southfield, use is currently unknown)
 John Grace Elementary School (Southfield, converted to the John Grace Community Center)
 John F. Kennedy Elementary School (Southfield, converted to the Southfield Education Center)
 Annie Lathrup Elementary School (Lathrup Village, longtime home of Yeshivat Akiva, last used as the Academy of Lathrup Village, building is now for lease)
 Fred D. Leonhard Elementary School (Southfield, use is currently unknown)
 McKinley Elementary School (Southfield, converted to the Academy of Southfield)
 Marion Simms Elementary School (Southfield, razed for Simms Park)
 Rotenburg Elementary School (Southfield, converted to Yeshiva Beth Yehuda School)
 Glenn Schoenhals Elementary School (Southfield, converted to the International Montessori Academy)
 Southfield No. 10 Elementary School (Southfield, converted to office space)

References

External links

 Southfield Public Schools
 

School districts in Michigan
Education in Oakland County, Michigan